Johannes Brassicanus can refer to:
 Johannes Brassicanus (humanist) (1475-1514), German humanist and scholar
 Johann Alexander Brassicanus (c. 1500-1539), Austrian jurist
 Johann Ludwig Brassicanus (1509-1549), Austrian jurist
 Johannes Brassicanus (composer) (c. 1570-1634), Austrian composer and poet